Hardin is a surname. Notable people with the surname include:

Charles Hardin Holley (1936-1959), birth name of Buddy Holly
Charles Henry Hardin (1820–1892), co-founder of Beta Theta Pi fraternity
Chelsea Hardin, American beauty pageant titleholder, Miss Hawaii USA 2016, and 1st runner up Miss USA 2016
Clifford M. Hardin, U.S. Secretary of Agriculture
DeVon Hardin, American basketball player
Garrett Hardin (1915–2003), American ecologist
George A. Hardin (1832–1901), New York lawyer and politician
Glen Hardin, American musician/piano player
Glenn Hardin (1910–1975), American athlete
Jerry Hardin, American actor
Jim Hardin (1943–1991), American baseball player
Jo Hardin, American statistician
John Hardin (1753–1792), Continental Army officer in the American Revolutionary War
John J. Hardin (1810–1847), U.S. Representative from Illinois
John Wesley Hardin (1853–1895), outlaw and gunfighter of the American Old West
Joseph Hardin Sr. (1734-1801), Patriot in the American Revolutionary War and politician.
Julia Hardin, All-American Girls Professional Baseball League player
 Lil Hardin Armstrong (1898–1971), American jazz musician and second wife of Louis Armstrong
Louis T. Hardin (1916–1999), American musician known as Moondog
Martin Davis Hardin (1837–1923), Union Army general in the American Civil War
Martin D. Hardin (1780–1823), U.S. Senator from Kentucky
Melora Hardin, American actress
Paul Hardin Jr. (1903–1996), bishop of The Methodist Church (USA)
Rusty Hardin, American attorney
Salvor Hardin, fictional character in Isaac Asimov's Foundation series
Terri Hardin, American puppeteer
Tim Hardin (1941–1980), American folk musician and composer
Ty Hardin (1930-2017), American actor